Gallavants is an American 1984 animated musical film produced by Marvel Productions, and released on home video.

Plot 
Gallavants are ants living in their own fairy-tale land, Ganteville. The little ones have to go to school in preparation of their adult life as working ants. However, one pupil, named Shando, thinks he doesn't need to take lessons and work hard, in order to find his destination in life. He has to learn the hard way... He goes on many adventures to earn his "kabump," a bump on his abdomen that signifies his rank as a fully-fledged member of Gallavant society, and along the way must rescue a lost Gallavant egg and outsmart a Vanterviper, a two-headed worm-like creature resembling an amphisbaena that eats the Gallavants and their eggs. He also meets a small, mysterious bouncing ball that is thought to have been a runaway egg that got exposed to the light, which he mistakes for his kabump.

Voice cast 
 Robert Lydiard . . . Shando
 Vic Perrin . . . Teetor
 Peter Cullen . . . Antonim
 Joyce Gittlin . . . Eegee
 Frank Welker . . . Antik/Traw
 Fred Travalena . . . Fice/Gokin
 Barry Gordon . . . Edil/Bok/Gank
 Diane Pershing . . . Nessa
 Jane Hamilton . . . Queen Mallikam
 B. J. Ward . . . Galli
 Wendy Hoffman . . . Babags/Foll
 Fred McGrath . . . Kubo
 Charlie Callas . . . Azor
 Ken Sansom . . . Thunk (the narrator)

Uncredited
 Unknown voice actor as Koosh

References

External links 

1984 films
1984 animated films
1980s American animated films
1984 fantasy films
1980s musical films
American children's animated adventure films
American children's animated fantasy films
American children's animated musical films
Animated films about insects
Marvel Productions films
1980s children's animated films
1980s English-language films